Ernest Pullein  FRCO (22 February 1880 - 28 January 1958) was an organist and composer based in England.

Life

He was born in 1878, the son of William Pullein and Hannah Rose. His father was a Professor of Music.

His three brothers, William Rose Pullein, Frank Pullein and John Pullein were also organists.

He was in the choir of Lincoln Cathedral as a boy.

He served in the Royal Naval Air Service in the First World War. His service number was F41719.

In 1922 he was charged with indecent assault on a youth of 16.

Cricket

He played Cricket for Lincolnshire County Cricket Club from 1908 to 1914. He wrote a booklet, Former Players of Lincoln City published by the Lincolnshire Chronicle in 1915.

Appointments

Organist of St. Andrew's Church, Lincoln 1898 - 1908 
Organist of St. Martin's Church, Lincoln 1908 - ????

Compositions

He composed organ and church music.

References

1880 births
1958 deaths
English organists
British male organists
English composers
Lincolnshire cricketers
English cricketers
20th-century organists
20th-century British male musicians
20th-century British musicians